Ditrigona sericea is a moth in the family Drepanidae. It was described by John Henry Leech in 1898. It is found in China, Myanmar and north-eastern India.

The wingspan is 12.5-17.5 mm for males and 15–21 mm for females. The forewings are white with the base of the costa pale brown. There are five brownish grey transverse fasciae: sub-basal, antemedial, broad postmedial and double subterminal. The last three are lunulate. The hindwings are as the forewings.

References

Moths described in 1898
Drepaninae
Moths of Asia